Aloeides tearei, the Teare's copper, is a butterfly in the family Lycaenidae. It is found in southern Namibia. The habitat consists of semi desert.

Adults are on wing from August to October and in February and May.

References

Butterflies described in 1982
Aloeides
Endemic fauna of Namibia
Butterflies of Africa